A splitting storm, commonly referred to as a "Splitting Supercell", is a phenomenon when a convective thunderstorm will appear to break in two, with one side propagating to the left (left mover) and the other to the right (right mover) of the hodograph. Mirror image storm splits are found in environments where there are large amounts of crosswise vorticity (i.e. the hodograph is straight, rather than curved) are present. Storm splits also occur in environments where streamwise vorticity is immediately present to an updraft (i.e. right or left curve to the hodograph), however in this situation one split is highly favored over the other, with the weaker split quickly dying; in this case, the lesser favored split may be so weak that the process is not noticeable on radar imagery.

Dynamics

Idealized example 
Consider an idealized environment where easterly winds are present at the surface. Ascending through the vertical column, the wind profile strongly veers resulting in calm winds in the mid levels and strong westerlies in the upper levels. A hodograph in this environment would be presented as a straight line (starting to the left (west) of the origin, crossing straight through the origin, then ending some distance to the right (east) of the origin. This environment would produce large amounts of crosswise vorticity (via the right hand rule, vorticity with an axis of rotation perpendicular to the environmental flow).

As an updraft begins to form, it will tend to tilt the crosswise vorticity lines into the vertical, resulting in an anticyclonic vorticity axis on the northern fringe and a cyclonic vorticity axis on the southern fringe of the updraft. At this point, despite vorticity lines being oriented in the vertical, the storm can not be considered a supercell, as the areas of rotation are outside of the main updraft. Due to the short time scale (scale analysis reveals the Coriolis acceleration in the vorticity equation is negligible on short time scales ), the areas of vorticity result in low pressure (perturbations) on the flanks of the convective updraft. Given favorable environmental thermodynamics (sufficient buoyancy and negligible convective inhibition {CIN}) these pressure perturbations will induce mass flux from below, initiating new convective updrafts. These new updrafts are now located "off" the hodograph, with one to the left and one to the right, both co-located with the previously mentioned pressure perturbations. The updraft can now enhance the vorticity (by as much as several orders of magnitude) through stretching. Additionally, since both new updrafts are now located off the hodograph, a streamwise vorticity component (quantifiable as Storm Relative Helicity...SRH) is able to be ingested into the storm (with the anticyclonic split ingesting negative SRH and the right split ingesting positive SRH). Each split now contains a rotating updraft and can be considered a supercell.

In this idealized environment, as new updrafts are initiated due to the pressure perturbations from the original split, additional crosswise vorticity will be tilted into the vertical on the flanks of the new updrafts. This will result in the continuation of the process that results in splitting, with a continuous propagation of new updrafts to the right and left of the hodograph. This allows each split to start the process over, splitting again and again until the environmental vertical wind shear no longer favors splitting supercells, or the storms have moved into an unfavorable thermodynamic environment.

Real world variations 
Hodographs shapes are rarely a straight line; however, some are close enough to the idealized example that mirror image splits will appear in radar imagery. In most cases, however, there is usually a slight curvature in the hodograph, which tends to favor one split over the other. Take, for example, a hodograph that carves out a shallow right curve. Both crosswise and streamwise vorticity are present in this environment. As with the idealized environment, crosswise vorticity lines are tilted into the vertical on the flanks of this updraft. Once the pressure perturbations initiate new updrafts on the flanks and they begin to rotate as a result of stretching and ingestion of newly experienced streamwise vorticity. The right split, having propagated even farther right to the hodograph, has increased the magnitude of positive SRH ingestion. This will serve to increase the rotation in the updraft, intensifying the pressure perturbation, strengthening the storm. On the other hand, the left mover, rotating anticyclonically, is struggling to maintain its updraft since it is ingesting positive environmental SRH. In this case, the left split will tend to weaken, as the right split becomes dominant.

In extreme cases, where there is a strongly curving clockwise hodograph, the left mover will be so weak from the start, the splitting process will not be evident on radar, and dominant right movers will immediately be present shortly after convective initiation.

Dominant left movers are rare, as a hodograph containing a counter-clockwise curving hodograph indicates backing winds and CAA, which does not favor ascent.

References

General references

Storm